Minnesota State Highway 62 (MN 62) is a highway in southwest Minnesota, which runs from its intersection with U.S. Highway 59 and Murray County Road 2 in Fulda and continues east to its eastern terminus at its intersection with U.S. 71 and State Highway 60 in Windom.

Route description
Highway 62 crosses the Des Moines River in Southbrook Township, Springfield Township, and in the city of Windom. The route is also known as 11th Street in Belfast Township.

The route is legally defined as part of Constitutional Route 16 in the Minnesota Statutes. It is not marked with this number.

History
Highway 62 was authorized in 1933. The route was paved by 1942.

A second State Highway 62 exists within the state of Minnesota. In 1988, former Hennepin County Highway 62 in the Twin Cities area was renumbered State Highway 62. MnDOT assigned the Twin Cities route its former Hennepin County numbering because of its local familiarity; and further determined that it was not necessary to renumber existing Highway 62 (between Fulda and Windom) because of what MnDOT perceived as low potential for confusion of the two routes.

Major intersections

References

062W
Transportation in Murray County, Minnesota
Transportation in Cottonwood County, Minnesota